Lazar "Grk" Lečić (Macedonia|Лазар Лечиќ; born January 30, 1939) is a retired Yugoslav-Macedonian professional basketball coach and player born. He is considered as founder of Macedonian basketball, who had a huge role in the exit of Macedonian basketball clubs in Europe in the 70's and 80's. Lecic is also responsible for founding and organizing the youth basketball schools in both Macedonia and Greece. In his lifelong odyssey he has won many prestigious awards such as "Giant" of the Macedonian Olympic Committee (2002), "Giant" of the Basketball Federation of Macedonia, "11th of October, 13th of November, 8 September, Zlatna Bubamara among many others.

Professional career
Lazar Lecic started his professional career in Rabotnički in 1957 and stayed in the club with the player status until 1962 before moving to the coaching position. As a player he won 2 Macedonian Republic League titles in 1960 and 1961. However, his true impact in basketball was jet to begin. In 1962 he sat on the coaching position in Rabotnicki and immediately made an impact. As a dominating force in Macedonia under the wings of Lecic, Rabotnicki won the following two titles in 1963 and 1964, and the team moved to First Federal Basketball League. Lecic stayed in Skopje until 1972 before moving on for another adventure in Borac Cacak for the 1972/73 season when the team finished 4th in Yugoslav First Basketball League as the club's biggest achievement in history. For the next season he moved to Slovenia and Olimpija Ljubljana, before taking on another adventure in Rabotnicki. This time leading the club from Skopje to the semifinals of the FIBA Saporta Cup that is still one of the biggest successes in the team history. In 1978 Lecic moved back to Olimpija Ljubljana where he stayed until 1982. After a season at Vojvodina Lecic was back at his home town, but this time at Skopje, later known as MZT Skopje. In 1986 by leadership of Lazar Lečić, MZT Skopje reached the Yugoslav First Basketball League where they competed for two seasons. In 1990 Lecic moved to Greece and Aris where he competed in the EuroLeague, reaching the Semifinals in 90/91 and Quarterfinals in 91/92. He also won the Greek League in 90/91 and Greek Cup in 91/92. After another season in MZT Skopje in 1996 when he won the Macedonian Cup and also made the Korać Cup R64, he temporarily resigned, but finished his wealthy career in Nikol Fert in the 1999/2000 season by winning the Macedonian League Championship.

Besides the club career, Lazar Lecic had an amazing national career as a coach in the Yugoslav National Team. He was an assistant coach in the Yugoslav team first golden medal in 1970 FIBA World Championship held in Yugoslavia. He also had an impact in the dominating years when Yugoslavia won medals in several competitions such as FIBA Eurobasket, Mediterranean Games and Balkanian Championships among others. He was also led Yugoslavia in the European Youth Basketball Championship in 1971.

Personal life
Lecic was born on 30 January 1939 in Skopje. His father name was Petar, while his mother name was Aleksandra. He finished Middle school and High school in Skopje, while he gained his Higher education in Belgrade 1963. He is considered an excellent trainer, a teacher who has a fantastic personality. Lecic or as his known by his nickname "Grk" was a trainer-charmer, always ready for a good joke, making positive atmosphere in the gym and outside of it. He was very strict in the training sessions, he did not give in to anyone, but not many people know basketball as he does. Many people did not take him seriously because of his, at first glance, innocence, irresistible charm, temperament and intrigue, but his impact, firstly on Macedonian basketball says all. He is responsible for the making of numerous basketball players who later led Macedonian basketball.

Lekic is known for his cocky moves that will be spoken throughout Europe for ages. Here are some of them:

Mustaches

In the 1975/76 season Rabotnicki played in the European Cup Winners Cup quarterfinals against French side ASPO Turs. In the first game played in France on 7 January 1976, Rabotnicki were down 53-38 by the first half and even worse for Lekic was the fact that Rabotnicki's only true center Dragan Radosavljevic already had 4 fouls. The half ended so in the locker room Lekic had one of his "ingenious" ideas. He ordered the team's masseur to immediately shave Radosavljevic's mustache and then asked that Radosavljevic, who otherwise carried a jersey with number 14, replaced the jersey with Nikiforovic who was wearing the number 4 jersey! In fact, Radosavljevic appeared in the "new edition" and without any personal fouls on the field, but this trickery, at first glance, did not helped, the home team won 99-83. The story, however, continues... 
Lecic then explained to Nikiforovoć that he will start the second half, that he is now Radosavljevic and that he starts the game with 4 personal fouls. At the beginning of the second half of the match, "Radosavljevic" pushed the opponent in the tip-off and got a personal fouls, according to the record - the fifth! The problem arose when real Nikiforovic "forgot" that he had 4 personal fouls, so when he started to explain to the referee that this was his first foul...

"I barely took his out of the field. He almost ruined everything for me" - later explained Lecic.

However, Lecic's trick did produce the result: Rabotnicki compensated for a deficit of 16 points, won 107-90 in Skopje and went to the semifinals in which he was eliminated from Olympia Milano.

The Poodle and the Shepherd Dog

At the same game against ASPO Turs behind the Rabotnicki bench there was an elegant lady who held a poodle in her hands. The dog misbehaved in moments so it would jump off the lady's hands and bark around Lecic's legs. Since the oral warnings did not help, the next time the dog jump down at Lecic's hands he grabbed him roughly by his neck and placed it in the arms of the lady. The poodle managed to escape again so this time anxious Lečić grabbed the poodle and threw the dog in the stands. It turned out that the poodle fell at the hands of Yugoslav sailors so within 10 seconds they threw the poodle back like it was a ping-pong ball!

"I barely got out of the arrest, you know how the French are when the animals are in question. In addition, the lady was the wife of the president of a local club. Somehow I got out of it, but I promised them that they would see in Skopje what the dog was" - said Lecic.

For the reverse game in Skopje, Lecic also "trained" a Shepherd Dog, who, as he say, looked like a bear. He dog behaved on the training sessions, but no one knew how would the dog react in a hall with 3,000 loud fans, especially because the atmosphere was "heated up" before the game with news of the mistreatment in France and referee theft in Tours. That's why there was an injection ready for the dog that would calm him down if it was too sloppy. As the game started the dog got nervous and instead of "scaring the French" it barked at everyone so he had to be taken off the gym, but the injection stayed inside...

"We were after 17 point difference and at the half it was 62-48 on our favor. Everything was saying we would succeed, but in the second half the visiting coach began to put pressure on the referee and the record table. Everything was bothering him, he complained about everything... I remembered those injections and organized, so the next time he passes by the record table, someone sting him by the butt a little. That's how it was. For minutes before the end he dosed off on the bench and we won 107-90, just as it was supposed to be. Later on ASPO Turs complained to whoever not, but Bora Stankovic of FIBA replied that they should be better off because if he repeats the match "Laza will come up with something else" - added Lecic.

Man-to-man defense on the referee!

In a packed "Tivoli" arena in Ljubljana, Rabotnicki faced Olimpija on the road. The home team is leading the game so Lazar Lecic calls a timeout. After the timeout one of Rabotnicki's players starts playing man-to-man defense on referee Dragaš Jakšić! The well-experienced ref goes to Lecic and asks him "Laza what is your player doing?" Lecic turns around and responds: "I told him to stay with you since I realized you are their best player. Is that right Jakša?!" The people around who heard their conversation burst into laugh, Dragaš Jakšić was the loudest.

References

External links
 Биографија на Лазар Лечиќ
 Лазар Лечиќ, кошаркарски тренер

1939 births
Living people
KK Borac Čačak coaches
KK Olimpija coaches
KK Vojvodina coaches
Macedonian basketball coaches
Macedonian men's basketball players
Macedonian people of Serbian descent
Yugoslav basketball coaches
Yugoslav men's basketball players